Leonel Anselmo Herrera Rojas (born 10 October 1948) is a Chilean former footballer who played as a centre-back for Universidad Católica, Colo Colo, Unión Española and O'Higgins and the Chile national team.

Personal life
Herrera was born in Tierra Amarilla, Chile.

He is the father of the former Chilean footballer Leonel Herrera Silva and his cousin, Eladio Rojas, is a historical player of the Chile national team.

Honours

Club
Colo-Colo
 Chilean Primera División (6): 1970, 1972, 1979, 1981, 1983, 1986
 Copa Chile (1): 1974
 Copa Polla Gol (3): 1981, 1982, 1985

Unión Española
 Chilean Primera División (1): 1977

International
Chile
  (2): , 
  (2): , 
  (1): 
  (1):

References

External links
 Profile at Colo-Colo Profile at
 Profile at Dale Albo Profile at

1948 births
Living people
People from Copiapó Province
Chilean footballers
Association football central defenders
Chile international footballers
Club Deportivo Universidad Católica footballers
Colo-Colo footballers
Unión Española footballers
O'Higgins F.C. footballers
Chilean Primera División players
Primera B de Chile players
1975 Copa América players
1983 Copa América players
Audax Italiano managers